Rocklunda IP is a sports venue in Rocklunda in Västerås, Sweden. It consists of venues for soccer, bandy, track and field athletics, ice hockey, baseball and American football. Bandy is currently played inside ABB Arena.

The 1990 Swedish Bandy Championship final was played at Rocklunda IP.

References

Bandy venues in Sweden
Swedish Bandy Final venues
Bandy World Championships stadiums